The Choró River is a river of Ceará state in eastern Brazil.

History
An unclassified extinct language called Teremembe, Tremembé, or Taramembé was originally spoken by a tribe on the coast between the mouth of the Monim River and the mouth of the Choró River. (See list of unclassified languages of South America.)

See also
List of rivers of Ceará

References

Brazilian Ministry of Transport

Rivers of Ceará